The E. Bright Wilson Award in Spectroscopy is awarded annually by the American Chemical Society to recognize outstanding accomplishments in fundamental or applied spectroscopy in chemistry.  It was first awarded in 1997 and was named in honor of the American Physical Chemist and Spectroscopy pioneer, E. Bright Wilson.

Past recipients
Source:
1997 Ahmed Zewail
1998 Robin M. Hochstrasser
1999 Richard N. Zare
2000 Ad Bax
2001 William A. Klemperer
2002 Takeshi Oka
2003 Marilyn E. Jacox
2004 James K.G. Watson
2005 Eizi Hirota
2006 Donald H. Levy
2007 Michael D. Fayer
2008 Jack H. Freed
2009 Paul F. Barbara
2010 George W. Flynn
2011 Veronica Vaida
2012 Robert W. Field
2013 Steven G. Boxer
2014 Richard P. Van Duyne
2015 R. J. Dwayne Miller
2016 Robert G. Griffin
2017 David J. Nesbitt
2018 Richard J. Saykally
2019 Martin Moskovits
2020 Angela M. Gronenborn

See also

 List of chemistry awards

References

External links
 American Chemical Society Awards Page 

Awards of the American Chemical Society
Physical chemistry
Awards established in 1997